Chuck Greenberg may refer to:
 Chuck Greenberg (musician) (1950–1995), American musical artist, composer and producer
 Chuck Greenberg (businessman) (born 1961), American sports attorney and former minority owner of the Texas Rangers baseball team